
This is a timeline of Spanish history, comprising important legal and territorial changes and political events in Spain and its predecessor states.  To read about the background to these events, see History of Spain.
 

 Centuries: 8th9th10th11th12th13th14th15th16th17th18th19th20th21st

8th century

9th century

10th century

11th century

12th century

13th century

14th century

15th century

16th century

17th century

18th century

19th century

20th century

21st century

References 

 
Spanish